Kentavia Miller (born 1994), known professionally as KenTheMan, is an American rapper.

Early life 
Kentavia Miller was born in Houston, Texas in 1994.

Career 
KenTheMan's stage name was originally an alter ego. While signing up for the music platform SoundCloud as an artist, she wanted to use the name "Ken", but noticed there were already many people on the platform operating under that name. She opted to use the aforementioned stage name instead. After completing high school, KenTheMan enrolled in college. She dropped out, but later re-enrolled in music courses, believing that discomfort would make her into a better musician. She dropped out again after deciding the approach wasn't working out well, and agreeing with her father that she would enroll once again if being a rapper didn't work out.

Initially working jobs as a waitress, KenTheMan worked as a delivery woman for the food service app DoorDash. She wrote the song "He Be Like" while working. The song became KenTheMan's first success as an artist. In 2021, she released the project What's My Name. It was ranked by Rolling Stone as the 16th best hip-hop album of the year. On October 14, 2022, KenTheMan released the single "Not My Nigga".

Personal life 
Miller is a mother.

Discography 

 What's My Name (2021)

References 

Rappers from Houston
1994 births
African-American women rappers
Living people
Rappers from Texas